Nguyễn Thanh Bình (born 11 August 1987) is a Vietnamese footballer who plays as a goalkeeper.

References 

1987 births
Living people
Vietnamese footballers
Association football goalkeepers
V.League 1 players
SHB Da Nang FC players
People from Da Nang
Vietnam international footballers